Labeobarbus pagenstecheri is a species of ray-finned fish in the  family Cyprinidae.
It is found only in Tanzania.
Its natural habitats are rivers and intermittent rivers. Its status is insufficiently known.

Sources

pagenstecheri
Taxa named by Johann Gustav Fischer
Fish described in 1884
Taxonomy articles created by Polbot